Thomas McCulloch (1 March 1934 – 10 December 2016) was a Scottish football goalkeeper.

McCulloch joined Clyde from local junior side Bridgeton Waverley in 1957. He won the Scottish Cup in 1958, his first season with the club and in senior football, keeping a clean sheet in the final against Hibernian. McCulloch was one of Clyde's greatest servants, and spent 15 years with the club, making 475 appearances in all competitions. He left Clyde in 1972 and joined Hamilton Academical for a year before retiring.

He played a total of 491 games in his 16-year career. He regularly attended Clyde functions, and was presented with a bottle of whisky in the 2007–08 Clyde player of the year event, to commemorate the 50th anniversary of the 1958 Scottish Cup win. He was inducted into the inaugural Clyde FC Hall of Fame in 2011. His death was announced on 10 December 2016.

Honours 
Clyde
Scottish Cup: 1957–58
Scottish Division Two: 1961–62
Promotion: 1963–64
Glasgow Cup: 1958–59
Runner up: 1963–64, 1967–68, 1970–71
Glasgow Charity Cup: 1957–58, 1960–61 (shared);
Runner up: 1958–59

References

External links
Clyde FC Hall of Fame profile

Dumbarton F.C. players
Clyde F.C. players
Association football goalkeepers
Hamilton Academical F.C. players
Bridgeton Waverley F.C. players
2016 deaths
Scottish Football League players
Scottish footballers
1934 births
Footballers from Glasgow
Place of death missing
Scottish Junior Football Association players